Dame Tariana Turia  (born 8 April 1944) is a former New Zealand politician. She was first elected to Parliament in 1996. Turia gained considerable prominence during the foreshore and seabed controversy in 2004, and eventually broke with the Labour Party as a result. She resigned from parliament, and successfully contested a by-election in her former electorate as a candidate of the newly formed Māori Party, of which became a co-leader. She retired from Parliament in 2014.

Early work
Turia was born in 1944 to an American (probably Native American) father and Māori mother. Her Māori roots are Ngāti Apa, Ngā Rauru, and Tūwharetoa iwi, among others.

She was married to George Turia, who has died. They have 4 children, 2 whāngai, 28 grandchildren, and great grandchildren.

Before entering politics, she had considerable involvement with a number of Māori organisations, working with Te Puni Kōkiri (the Ministry of Māori Development) and a number of Māori health providers. She also had associations with the Te Kura Kaupapa and kohanga reo movements.

Member of Parliament

Turia entered the New Zealand Parliament in the 1996 election as a list MP for the Labour Party, ranking 20th on the party list. In the 1999 election, she remained a list MP, but ranked sixteenth. In the 2002 election, however, she contested the Te Tai Hauāuru Māori electorate, and opted not to place herself on the party list at all. Te Tai Hauāuru (roughly, the Māori voters of the west of the North Island) returned her as their member of parliament.

Although never a member of Cabinet, Turia has held a number of non-Cabinet ministerial roles. From Labour's electoral victory in 1999, she served as Associate Minister of Māori Affairs, Associate Minister of Social Services and Employment, Associate Minister of Health, and Associate Minister of Housing. In 2002, she also became Associate Minister of Corrections. After the formation of the Labour-Progressive coalition in 2002, she dropped the Corrections role and gained full ministerial rank as Minister for the Community and Voluntary Sector.

Foreshore and seabed legislation
When debate about ownership of New Zealand's foreshore and seabed broke out in 2003, and the Labour Party proposed vesting ownership in the state, Turia voiced dissatisfaction. Along with many of her supporters in Te Tai Hauāuru, she claimed that Labour's proposal amounted to an outright confiscation of Māori land. When it became publicly known that Turia might vote against Labour's bill in parliament, tensions between Turia and the Labour Party's leadership increased. The hierarchy strongly implied that if Turia did not support Labour policy, she could not retain her ministerial roles.

By-election
On 30 April 2004, after a considerable period of confusion about Turia's intentions, she announced that she would resign from parliament on 17 May. This precipitated a by-election being called in Te Tai Hauāuru, which Turia contested as a member of the new Māori Party that formed around her. On the same day that Turia announced her resignation, Prime Minister Helen Clark sacked her from her ministerial posts.

Her supporters see Turia as having bravely defied her party in order to stand up for her principles. The Labour Party has criticised Turia for putting the foreshore and seabed issue before the party's wider policies for Māori development, and says that she has unreasonably focused on a single issue. Helen Clark said that Turia had shown "an astonishing lack of perspective". Turia described the Te Tai Hauāuru by-election of 10 July 2004 as a chance to test her mandate, and to ensure that she had the support of her voters, but doubts remained about the significance of the by-election, since none of the major parties put forward candidates. Labour called the event "a waste of time and money", although the by-election was required by waka-jumping law in force at the time.

Turia received 92.74% of the vote in the by-election, and resumed her seat in Parliament on 27 July 2004.

2005 general election

On 17 September 2005, the Māori Party contested the general election with electoral candidates in all seven of the Māori seats. Turia was re-elected in Te Tai Hauāuru and that night three more Māori Party candidates won parliamentary seats, Pita Sharples (co-leader) in Tāmaki Makaurau, Hone Harawira in Te Tai Tokerau and Te Ururoa Flavell in Waiariki. The winning of the four seats resulted in celebration for their supporters who anticipated seeing an independent, Māori voice in parliament. However, the Māori Party share of the party vote across the country was 2.1 percent, placing them sixth out of the eight parties in parliament by party vote. This was attributed to voters in the Māori electorates mainly giving their party vote to the incumbent Labour government.

2008 general election and ministerial posts
Support for the Māori Party in the 2008 general election increased with the party gaining an additional seat. National won most seats overall, to form a minority government with support from the Māori Party as well as ACT New Zealand and United Future. In return for Māori Party support in confidence and supply, John Key agreed to not abolish the Māori seats without the consent of Māori. It was also agreed to review the Foreshore and Seabed Act 2004 and to consider Māori representation in a wider constitutional review which began in 2010. Turia and co-leader Sharples were both made Ministers, although like other support party members both remained outside Cabinet. Turia was given the portfolios of Minister for the Community and Voluntary Sector, Associate Minister of Health and Associate Minister for Social Development and Employment, while Sharples was made Minister of Māori Affairs.

When Paula Bennett stepped down as Minister for Disability Issues on 30 June 2009, Key appointed Turia the new minister. In 2010, the National and Māori Parties announced Whānau Ora, a taskforce designed to streamline social service resources. Turia was announced Minister responsible for the implementing of the scheme.

On 7 April 2011, during the term of the 49th New Zealand Parliament, the composition of the Abortion Supervisory Committee was debated. Turia moved that an anti-abortion Pacific Island doctor, Ate Moala, be appointed to the ASC. The vote was lost 67–31 against, with twenty four absences or abstentions.

Life after Parliament
In 2022, Turia drew media attention for her anti-vaccinationist views and opposition to mask mandates during the COVID-19 pandemic. On 17 February 2022, Turia accused Prime Minister Jacinda Ardern of having Nazi sympathies on Radio New Zealand, in an interview about the Sixth Labour Government's response to the 2022 Wellington anti-vaccination protests. She falsely claimed that Ardern had been filmed as a student doing “almost a Heil Hitler salute”.

Honours
In the 2015 New Year Honours, Turia was appointed a Dame Companion of the New Zealand Order of Merit for services as a Member of Parliament.

References

External links

Te Tai Hauāuru
Profile at Māori Party
 Tariana Turia interviewed on Radio New Zealand Matangireia, 26 September 2019

|- style="text-align: center;"

|-

|-

1944 births
Living people
New Zealand Rātanas
Māori Party MPs
New Zealand Labour Party MPs
Māori Party co-leaders
Women government ministers of New Zealand
New Zealand list MPs
New Zealand MPs for Māori electorates
Ngāti Apa people
Ngāti Tūwharetoa people
Members of the New Zealand House of Representatives
Government ministers of New Zealand
Dames Companion of the New Zealand Order of Merit
21st-century New Zealand politicians
21st-century New Zealand women politicians
Women members of the New Zealand House of Representatives